"Hold On" is a song by American girl group En Vogue, released in early 1990 as the first single from their debut album, Born to Sing (1990). It was produced by Denzil Foster and Thomas McElroy, and written by the former two and all members of the group. It peaked at number five in the UK and number two on the Billboard Hot 100 in the US. In addition, the song reached number-one on both the Billboard Dance Club Songs and Hot R&B/Hip-Hop Songs charts. In 2007, the song's chorus was used and performed by Pharrell on Jay-Z's song "Blue Magic". It was also sampled in the Terminator X song "Buck Whylin'". En Vogue performed "Hold On" at the 2008 BET Awards with Alicia Keys. In 2017, it was ranked number four in Spin magazine's ranking of "The 30 Best '90s R&B Songs".

Production
"Hold On" samples the guitar riff from "The Payback" by James Brown. The song opens with an a cappella rendition of the Motown standard "Who's Lovin' You", written by Smokey Robinson and originally recorded by his group, the Miracles. It features lead vocals by Cindy Herron and Terry Ellis vocals on the introduction.

Commercial performance
Following its release, the single peaked number one on the US Billboard Hot R&B Singles chart, number two on Billboards Hot 100, and number one on Billboards Hot Dance chart. "Hold On" was also a hit in several countries worldwide, reaching number five in the United Kingdom and New Zealand, number six in Germany, number ten in the Netherlands, and number 12 in Austria. It was the top R&B hit on the Billboard Year-End chart for 1990, and was the eighth most-successful pop hit on the Billboard Hot 100 Year-End chart.

Critical reception
David Taylor-Wilson from Bay Area Reporter complimented the song as "sexy and gentle, with a teasing, downtempo dance beat." Bill Coleman from Billboard commented, "Step back and give 'em some room! Quartet of future divas fresh from the Foster/McElroy stable deliver intricate, tight harmonies with a dash of sass on this groove-laden debut. Can't wait for the album." He also noted its "lazy and hypnotic R&B pulse [that] serves as the perfect bed for the members' on-the-money styling; you would be doing your dancefloor a great disservice if you ignored it..." Jan DeKnock from Chicago Tribune felt that En Vogue's "tasty harmonies are supported by an equally intoxicating groove." A. Scott Galloway from The Network Forty wrote, "Gold single, golden girls! What more do you need to convince you to spin this hardcore dance floor jam." Gerald Martinez from New Sunday Times declared it as "gospel-funk" with "stunning vocal arrangements." 

In his album review, Edward Hill from The Plain Dealer remarked that "Hold On" "is already famous for its no-holds-barred a cappella opening and sluggishly powerful bassline. On 12-inch it's pepped up with bonus beats and a slightly faster rhythm track." David Quantick from Smash Hits complimented it as "lithe and lovely". Steve Daly, writing for Spin magazine, said the song is "perfect for those warm evening on the stoop", and felt that the "exotic melody takes its cue from Soul II Soul, while the rhythm section does a slow grind in 95 percent humidity with no AC." Cheo H. Coker from Stanford Daily wrote, "It was the first song in a long time that featured real singing, perfect four-part harmony (a capella no less), and a mother lode of hip-hop attitude and feeling." A reviewer from Wells Journal called it "a moody but repetitive song with mellow backing track".

Retrospective review
Retrospectively, AllMusic editor Jose F. Promis described the song as a "cool, shuffling, timeless hip-hop R&B track". Another editor, Stephen Thomas Erlewine, described it as "yearning". In 2007, Laura Checkoway from Vibe declared it as "an answer of sorts" to 1962's "Who's Lovin' You" from Smokey Robinson & The Miracles.

Music video
A music video was produced to promote the single, directed by Indian director Tarsem Singh. It begins with a close-up of Terry Ellis singing the lead vocals of the intro, with the three other girls standing either behind her or in front of her. They are all dressed in black. When the rhythm kicks in, several male dancers appears. Cindy Herron then are singing the lead vocals, standing in the front, with the three others backing her.

Impact and legacy
The Daily Telegraph ranked "Hold On" number 47 in their "Top 50 Dance Songs" list in 2015, adding: "R&B girl group En Vogue broke through with this club classic. A sharp acapella rendition of Motown standard Who's Lovin You leads into a hip-hop beat with a funky bass line, horn and piano sounds. "You've got to hold on, to your love", the girls proclaim, and it is their powerful singing that carries this one."

Spin placed the song at number four in their list of "The 30 Best '90s R&B Songs" in 2017. They wrote: "Producers Foster & McElroy deliver a slow-burning rhythm with a James Brown drum kick, but "Hold On's" greatest element is Herron, Terry Ellis, Dawn Robinson, and Maxine Jones blending their voices into a sound that shifts the culture."

In 2019, Billboard listed it at number 130 in their ranking of "Billboards Top Songs of the '90s".

Awards and nominations

Track listings

 US 12-inch vinyl
A1. "Hold On" (album version) — 5:18
B1. "Hold On" (instrumental) — 3:56
B2. "Hold On" (dub version) — 3:56

 US cassette single
A. "Hold On"
B. "Luv Lines"

 Germany 7-inch single
 "Hold On" (7-inch edit) — 4:23
 "Hold On" (instrumental) — 3:56

 European CD single "Hold On" (seven inch edit) — 4:23
 "Hold On" (extended version) — 5:16
 "Hold On" (radio version with intro) — 5:07

 UK cassette single' "Hold On" (Tuff Jam's Radio Mix) — 4:04
 "Hold On" (C-Swing's Jerk Mix Radio Edit) — 4:00

Credits and personnel
Credits are adapted from the liner notes of Born to Sing''.

 Terry Ellis – vocals
 Dawn Robinson – vocals
 Cindy Herron – vocals
 Maxine Jones – vocals
 Mark Fisher – keyboards
 Grover Washington, Jr. – saxophone
 David Lombard – executive producer
 Thomas McElroy – producer, music
 Denzil Foster – executive producer, producer, music

Charts

Weekly charts

Year-end charts

Certifications

See also
 R&B number-one hits of 1990 (USA)
 List of number-one year-end R&B singles (U.S.)
 Number-one dance hits of 1990

References

External links
 

1989 songs
1990 debut singles
Atlantic Records singles
En Vogue songs
Music videos directed by Tarsem Singh
New jack swing songs
Songs written by Dawn Robinson
Songs written by Denzil Foster
Songs written by Fred Wesley
Songs written by James Brown
Songs written by John "Jabo" Starks
Songs written by Smokey Robinson
Songs written by Thomas McElroy
Song recordings produced by Foster & McElroy